The 2018 season is Santos Futebol Clube's 106th season in existence and the club's fifty-ninth consecutive season in the top flight of Brazilian football. As well as the Campeonato Brasileiro, the club competes in the Copa do Brasil, the Campeonato Paulista and also in Copa Libertadores.

Players

Squad information

Source: SantosFC.com.br (for appearances and goals), Wikipedia players' articles (for international appearances and goals), FPF (for contracts). Players in italic are not registered for the Campeonato Paulista

Reserve players

Copa Libertadores squad

1

1

1

1

1

1: Vitor Bueno, Emiliano Vecchio, Caju, Diogo Vitor and Matheus Jesus were unregistered, with Carlos Sánchez, Gabriel Calabres, Bryan Ruiz, Yuri and Derlis González being registered in their places, respectively.

Appearances and goals

Last updated: 3 December 2018
Source: Match reports in Competitive matches, Soccerway

Goalscorers

Last updated: 3 December 2018
Source: Match reports in Competitive matches

Disciplinary record

As of 3 December 2018
Source: Campeonato Paulista
 = Number of bookings;  = Number of sending offs after a second yellow card;  = Number of sending offs by a direct red card.

Suspensions served

Injuries

Squad number changes

Managers

Transfers

Transfers in

Loans in

Transfers out

Loans out

Pre-season and Friendlies

Sources:

Competitions

Overview

Campeonato Brasileiro

Results summary

Results by round

League table

Matches

Copa do Brasil

Round of 16

Quarter-final

Campeonato Paulista

Results summary

Group stage

Matches

Knockout stage

Quarter-final

Semi-final

Copa Libertadores

Group stage

Knockout stage

Round of 16

References

Notes

External links
Official Site 
Official YouTube Channel 

2018
Santos F.C.